Kreis Mogilno was one of many Kreise (counties) in the northern administrative region of Bromberg, in the Prussian province of Posen, from 1815-1919. Its capital was Mogilno.

History
Kreis Mogilno (1815-1919) was a Kreis (county) in the northern administrative region of Bromberg, in the Prussian province of Posen. The territory was created as part of the Grand Duchy of Posen (1815-1848, in personal union with Prussia) and later was part of the Prussian Province of Posen (1848-1919). On January 18, 1871, Kreis Mogilno, along with all of Prussia, became part of the German Empire. The territory of Kreis Mogilno was reduced slightly in 1887 when its western extension (most of the Rogowo and Mittelwalde districts) was used to create the new Znin district.

Kreis Mogilno was part of the military command (German: Bezirkskommando) at Gnesen (Gniezno). The main court (German: Landgericht) was in Gnesen (Gniezno), with lower courts (German: Amtsgericht) in Tremessen (Trzemeszno) and Mogilno.

On December 27, 1918, the Greater Poland uprising began in the province of Posen, and by December 31, 1918, the town of Mogilno was under Polish control. On February 16, 1919, an armistice ended the Polish-German fighting, and on June 28, 1919, the German government officially ceded Kreis Mogilno to the Second Polish Republic with the signing of the Treaty of Versailles.

During World War II, the territory of the former Kreis again became Landkreis Mogilno (Wartheland), 1939-1945 in Nazi Germany.

Demographics
According to the Prussian census of 1890, Kreis Mogilno had a population of 40,158, of which 74% were Poles and 26% were Germans.

Table of Standesämter  
"Standesamt" is the German name of the local civil registration offices which were established in October 1874 soon after the German Empire was formed. Births, marriages and deaths were recorded. Previously, only duplicate copies of church records were used. By 1905, Kreis Mogilno had the following 9 offices for rural residents:

Altraden district was created in 1903 from parts of Pakosch and Mogilno districts. Kirchlich Palendzie district was called Hartfeld/Padniewo prior to 1886. In addition, the following cities were separate districts for urban residents: Gembitz, Mogilno, Tremessen.

Table of all communities

References

External links
 List of genealogical records
 Facsimiles of registration books

Navigation Bar 

This article is part of the project Wikipedia:WikiProject Prussian Kreise. Please refer to the project page, before making changes.

Districts of the Province of Posen
1871 establishments in Germany
1919 disestablishments in Germany